Amirabad (also Romanized as Amīrābād; also known as Shahrak-e Amīrābād) is a village in Bibi Sakineh Rural District of Safadasht District of Malard County, Tehran province, Iran. At the 2006 National Census, its population was 5,042 in 1,212 households, when it was in the former Malard District of Shahriar County. The following census in 2011 counted 5,506 people in 1,491 households, by which time the district had been separated from the county and Malard County established. The latest census in 2016 showed a population of 5,221 people in 1,458 households; it was the largest village in its rural district.

References 

Malard County

Populated places in Tehran Province

Populated places in Malard County